The 2022–23 season is AFC Uttara's 14th season since its establishment in 2009 and their 1st season in the Bangladesh Premier League. They achieved promotion to the Bangladesh Premier league after being second of the 2021–22 Bangladesh Championship League. In addition to domestic league, AFC Uttara will participate on this season's edition of Federation Cup and Independence Cup. The season covering the period from 
8 November 2022 to July 2023.

Current squad
AFC Uttara squad for 2022–23 season.

Transfer

In

Competitions

Overall

Overview

Premier League

League table

Results summary

Results by round

Matches

Federation Cup

Group stages

Independence Cup

Group stage

Super Cup

Qualifying round

Statistics

Goalscorers

Source: Matches

References

Football clubs in Bangladesh
Sport in Bangladesh
Uttara
2023 in Bangladeshi football
2022 in Bangladeshi football